Panama competed at the 2004 Summer Olympics in Athens, Greece, from 13 to 29 August 2004. This was the nation's fourteenth appearance at the Olympics since its debut in 1920. Panama did not compete on four occasions, including the 1980 Summer Olympics in Moscow, because of its partial support of the United States boycott.

Comité Olímpico de Panamá sent the nation's smallest delegation to the Games since the 1952 Summer Olympics in Helsinki. A total of four athletes, three men and one woman, competed only in athletics and swimming. Freestyle swimmer, Pan American Games medalist, and three-time Olympian Eileen Coparropa reprised her role to carry the Panamanian flag in the opening ceremony for the third consecutive time since her debut, as a fifteen-year-old, in 1996.

Panama has yet to claim its first Olympic medal after the 1948 Summer Olympics in London. Track star Bayano Kamani narrowly missed out on the medal podium after earning a highest result for the Panamanian team in the men's 400 m hurdles with an astonishing fifth-place finish.

Athletics

Panamanian athletes have so far achieved qualifying standards in the following athletics events (up to a maximum of 3 athletes in each event at the 'A' Standard, and 1 at the 'B' Standard).

Men
Track & road events

Field events

Swimming

Panamanian swimmers earned qualifying standards in the following events (up to a maximum of 2 swimmers in each event at the A-standard time, and 1 at the B-standard time):

Men

Women

See also
 Panama at the 2003 Pan American Games
 Panama at the 2004 Summer Paralympics

References

External links
Official Report of the XXVIII Olympiad
Panama Olympic Committee 

Nations at the 2004 Summer Olympics
2004 Summer Olympics
Summer Olympics